The 1994–95 Primeira Divisão was the 61st edition of top flight of Portuguese football. It started on 21 August 1994 with a match between Belenenses and Estrela da Amadora, and ended on 28 May 1995. The league was contested by 18 clubs with Benfica as the defending champions.

Porto won the league and qualified for the 1995–96 UEFA Champions League group stage, Sporting qualified for the 1994–95 UEFA Cup Winners' Cup first round, and Benfica, Vitória de Guimarães and Farense qualified for the 1995–96 UEFA Cup; in opposite, União da Madeira, Beira-Mar and Vitória de Setúbal were relegated to the Liga de Honra. Hassan  was the top scorer with 21 goals.

Promotion and relegation

Teams relegated to Liga de Honra
Paços de Ferreira
Famalicão
Estoril-Praia

Paços de Ferreira, Famalicão and Estoril-Praia, were consigned to the Liga de Honra following their final classification in 1993–94 season.

Teams promoted from Liga de Honra
Tirsense
União de Leiria
Chaves

The other three teams were replaced by Tirsense, União de Leiria and Chaves from the Liga de Honra.

Teams

Stadia and locations

Managerial changes

League table

Results

Top goalscorers

Source: Footballzz

Footnotes

External links
 Portugal 1994-95 - RSSSF (Jorge Miguel Teixeira)
 Portuguese League 1994/95 - footballzz.co.uk
 Portugal - Table of Honor - Soccer Library 

Primeira Liga seasons
Port
1994–95 in Portuguese football